UN Security Council Resolution 731, adopted unanimously on 21 January 1992, after recalling resolutions 286 (1970) and 635 (1989) which condemned acts of terrorism, the Council expressed its concern over the results of investigations into the destruction of Pan Am Flight 103 over Lockerbie, Scotland, and UTA Flight 772 over Chad and Niger which implicated officials from the Government of Libya.

The Council condemned the fact that Libya had not accepted responsibility for the incidents, and urged it to provide a full and effective response to the requests from the investigations with regards to the two aircraft so as to contribute to the elimination of international terrorism. It also urged Member States to encourage the Libyan government to respond. Therefore, the resolution implied that Libya extradite its two accused nationals, Abdelbaset al-Megrahi and Lamin Khalifah Fhimah.

Resolution 731 was not legally binding, as it was passed under Chapter VI of the United Nations Charter and makes no reference to Chapter VII; however, this would be enforced in Resolution 748.

See also
 Chadian–Libyan conflict
 Foreign relations of Libya
 Investigation into the bombing of Pan Am Flight 103
 List of United Nations Security Council Resolutions 701 to 800 (1991–1993)

References

External links
 
Text of the Resolution at undocs.org

 0731
1992 in Libya
Pan Am Flight 103
 0731
 0731
January 1992 events